Sankin Ail (Tagda-Ayıl) is a rural locality (a selo) in Tondoshskoye Rural Settlement of Turochaksky District, the Altai Republic, Russia. The population was 115 as of 2016. There are 6 streets.

Geography 
Sankin Ail is located near the Biya River, 9 km south of Turochak (the district's administrative centre) by road. Turochak is the nearest rural locality.

References 

Rural localities in Turochaksky District